This is a list of finalists for the 2010 Archibald Prize for portraiture (listed is Artist – Title). 

 Giles Alexander – The alternative ambassadors (Professors Ross Garnaut &  Martin Green)
 Martin Ball – Jacqueline Fahey
 Kate Beynon – Self portrait with guardian spirits
 Shane Bowden and Dean Reilly – I wake up with Today! 
 Adam Chang – Two eyes – closing to open (Simeon Kronenberg) 
 Kordelya Chi – Mr Walker
 Kevin Connor – Self portrait
 Adam Cullen – Gareth at the country fair 
 Marc de Jong – Janice Petersen
 McLean Edwards – Tim Storrier
 Carla Fletcher – C. W. Stoneking
 Robert Hannaford – Malcolm Fraser
 Cherry Hood – Michael Zavros
 Peter Clifton Kendall – Underdog
 Jasper Knight – Bill Wright AM
 Sam Leach – Tim Minchin (Winner of the Archibald Prize) 
 Robert Malherbe – The squire – portrait of Luke Sciberras 
 Alexander McKenzie – Andrew Upton
 Nigel Milsom – Adam Cullen (bird as prophet) 
 James Money – The Lord Mayor of Melbourne
 Nafisa – Glenn in black & white (Winner of the Packing Room Prize) 
 Paul Newton – Self portrait #2 – dark night of the soul
 Khue Nguyen – Unleashed
 Christine O’Hagan – Kate Ceberano
 Rodney Pople – Stelarc triptych 
 Victor Rubin – John Olsen – A diptych – part I seated: part II in his bath
 Craig Ruddy – The prince of darkness – Warwick Thornton (Winner of the People's Choice Award) 
 Paul Ryan – Danie Mellor, true blue country
 Peter Smeeth – Peter FitzSimons, author
 Ian Smith – Keith Looby alfresco
 Greg Somers – Self portrait with the picture of dory in grey
 Nick Stathopoulos – The bequest 
 Yi Wang – Bishop Elliott and Lady Jacqueline
 Apple Yin – The previous life

See also 
Previous year: List of Archibald Prize 2009 finalists
Next year: List of Archibald Prize 2011 finalists
List of Archibald Prize winners

External links
Archibald Prize 2010 finalists, official website, Art Gallery of NSW

2010
Archibald
Archibald Prize 2010
Archibald Prize 2010
Arch
Archibald